Yu-Gi-Oh! Arc-V is the fifth spin-off anime in the Yu-Gi-Oh! franchise, produced by Nihon Ad Systems and broadcast by TV Tokyo. It is directed by Katsumi Ono and produced by Studio Gallop. Its plot focuses on Yuya Sakaki. Yuya is a boy seeking to become the greatest entertainer in Action Duels who brings forth a new summoning method to Duel Monsters known as Pendulum Summoning. The anime premiered in Japan on April 6, 2014 and released internationally by 4K Media Inc. 

There are four music themes used for season 1: two openings and two endings. From episodes 1–30, the first opening theme is "Believe × Believe" by Bullet Train, while the first ending theme is "One Step" by P-Cute. From episodes 31–49, the second opening theme is "Burn!" by Bullet Train, while the second ending theme is "Future Fighter!" by Kenshō Ono and Yoshimasa Hosoya. For the English dub version, the opening theme is "Can You Feel the Power".

The English dub premiered episodes in Canada and Australia on Teletoon and 9Go! respectively. In the United States, Nicktoons aired the season from February 2016 to December 2017.


Episode list

Notes

References

Arc-V (season 1)
2014 Japanese television seasons
2015 Japanese television seasons